Isidore Dollinger (November 13, 1903 – January 30, 2000) was an American lawyer, jurist, and politician who served five terms in the U.S. House of Representatives, representing New York from 1949 to 1959.

Life
Dollinger was born on November 13, 1903, in New York City. He graduated from New York University in 1925, and from New York Law School in 1928. He was admitted to the bar in 1929.

He was a member of the New York State Assembly (Bronx County, 4th District) in 1937, 1938, 1939–40, 1941–42 and 1943–44.

Political career 
He was a member of the New York State Senate (26th District) from 1945 to 1948, sitting in the 165th and 166th New York State Legislatures.

Congress 
Dollinger was elected as a Democrat to the 81st, 82nd, 83rd, 84th, 85th and 86th United States Congresses, holding office from January 3, 1949, to December 31, 1959, when he resigned to take office as District Attorney of Bronx County.

New York Supreme Court 
He was a Justice of New York Supreme Court (1st District) from 1969 to 1973, and an Official Referee (i.e. a senior judge on an additional seat) of the Supreme Court from 1974 to 1975.

Death 
He died on January 30, 2000, in White Plains, New York, and was buried at Mount Hebron Cemetery in Flushing, Queens.

See also
List of Jewish members of the United States Congress

References

External links

1903 births
2000 deaths
Burials at Mount Hebron Cemetery (New York City)
Democratic Party New York (state) state senators
Democratic Party members of the New York State Assembly
Bronx County District Attorneys
New York Supreme Court Justices
New York University alumni
New York Law School alumni
Politicians from the Bronx
Democratic Party members of the United States House of Representatives from New York (state)
20th-century American politicians
20th-century American judges